Cosmopepla uhleri is a stink bug native to the western regions of the United States, including California and Oregon. It is black with an orange transhumeral band that has black spots. It uses Scrophularia californica as a host.

References 

Carpocorini